Pierre Delorme (de L'Orme) (ca October 1, 1832 – November 10, 1912) was a Métis fur trader, businessman, farmer and political figure. He represented Provencher in the House of Commons of Canada during the 1st Canadian Parliament as a Conservative member from 1871 to 1872. He also represented St. Norbert South in the Legislative Assembly of Manitoba from 1870 to 1874 and St. Norbert from 1878 to 1879.

One of his great-grandchildren is best-selling Métis author George R. D. Goulet. The Provincial Road 210 bridge over the Red River near St. Adolphe is named after Pierre Delorme.

Life 
He was born in St. Boniface, Manitoba in 1832 to Joseph Amable Fafard dit Delorme and Josephte Bellisle. He worked for the Hudson's Bay Company at Swan River from 1852 to 1856.

In 1854, he was married to Adélaïde Millet dit Beauchemin, daughter of André Millet dit Beauchemin and Madeleine Ducharme. After that, he settled on a farm near Pointe-Coupée (St. Adolphe). He was a member of the provisional government established by Louis Riel and captured Major Charles Arkoll Boulton, Thomas Scott, and others when they attempted to take over Upper Fort Garry (now Winnipeg). He left Riel's government after Boulton was sentenced to be executed. In 1870, he was named a justice of the peace. In 1871, he was part of a group of volunteers organized to defend Manitoba against the Fenian raids. Delorme promoted Louis Riel as a candidate for Provencher in 1872, when Riel stepped aside for Sir George-Étienne Cartier, and 1873. He was named hay commissioner in 1873 and served on the Council of the North-West Territories from 1873 to 1875. He was named minister of agriculture and president of the executive council for Manitoba in 1878. Even after he left politics, Delorme lobbied for amnesty for Riel and for Métis land rights.

Delorme died at St. Adolphe, Manitoba in 1912.

References

External links
Biography at the Dictionary of Canadian Biography Online

1823 births
1912 deaths
Businesspeople from Winnipeg
People from Saint Boniface, Winnipeg
Politicians from Winnipeg
Members of the House of Commons of Canada from Manitoba
Conservative Party of Canada (1867–1942) MPs
Progressive Conservative Party of Manitoba MLAs
Members of the Legislative Assembly of the Northwest Territories
People of the Fenian raids
Métis politicians
Métis fur traders
Canadian fur traders
Members of the Executive Council of Manitoba
Indigenous Members of the House of Commons of Canada
Members of the Legislative Assembly of Assiniboia
Canadian Métis people
Goulet family